Nissan Spivak   (widely known as Nissi Belzer, from Yiddish Belts; 1824–1906) was a Jewish cantor and composer.

Career 
He was cantor in his birthplace of Bălţi (Beltsy), Bessarabia, and was generally known as ‘Nisn Beltzer’. Later he was cantor at Kishinev (Bessarabia) and from 1877 at Berdychiv (now in Ukraine).

In his childhood he had an accident which damaged his voice but he had an extensive reputation primarily as a composer and choir conductor. It was his vocal handicap that led him to develop original synagogue music in which the choir, instead of being merely an accompaniment or used for responses, was assigned lengthy ensembles - with solos and duets - reducing the role of the cantor. Spivak attracted many students to Berdychiv, including Boris Thomashefsky and Lipa Feingold, and took his choirs to other centers, including Hasidic courts.

Spivak died in Ukraine and was survived by his son Joseph Spivak.

References

Bibliography 

 

1824 births
1906 deaths
Jews from the Russian Empire
Bessarabian Jews
Hazzans
Jewish composers
People from Bălți
People from Beletsky Uyezd
People from Berdychiv
19th-century male singers from the Russian Empire